Melodi Jaya Sports Club is a football club from Johor. The team formerly plays in the Malaysia FAM Cup and has pulled from the league for financial reasons.

Coaches

External links
 Melodi Jaya Facebook Page

2006 establishments in Malaysia
Association football clubs established in 2006
Defunct football clubs in Malaysia
Sport in Johor